Nikola Dovedan (born 6 July 1994) is an Austrian professional footballer who plays as a centre forward or attacking midfielder for Austria Wien.

References

External links

 Profile at ÖFB
 

1994 births
Austrian people of Serbian descent
Living people
Association football midfielders
Austrian footballers
Austria youth international footballers
LASK players
FC Liefering players
SC Rheindorf Altach players
1. FC Heidenheim players
1. FC Nürnberg players
FK Austria Wien players
2. Bundesliga players
2. Liga (Austria) players
Austrian Football Bundesliga players
Austrian expatriate footballers
Expatriate footballers in Germany
Austrian expatriate sportspeople in Germany